This article lists the team squads of the  2008 FIFA U-20 Women's World Cup.

Group A

Chile

Head coach:  Marta Tejedor

England

Head coach: Mo Marley

New Zealand

Head coach:  John Herdman

Nigeria

Head coach: Daniel Evumena

Group B

Argentina

China PR

France
 Head coach: Stephane Pilard

United States

Head coach: Tony DiCicco

Group C

Canada

Head coach: Ian Bridge

DR Congo
Coach: Poly Bonghanya

Germany

Japan
The squad was announced on 30 October 2011.

Coach: Norio Sasaki

Group D

Brazil

North Korea

Mexico

Head coach: Andrea Rodebaugh

Norway

References

FIFA U-20 Women's World Cup squads
2008 in youth sport